Simen Axel Stamsø-Møller (born 6 September 1988) is a Norwegian former football forward, as well as a football commentator on national television.

Career

Early career
He started his youth career in Lille Tøyen, before he transferred to the local talent club Skeid, at the age of 10. In Skeid he was overshadowed by his older brother, Julian, and when he started at Bjerke Upper Secondary School, he chose to study media and communications, instead of elite sports like his brother. He therefore left Skeid, and signed for Kjelsås.

Kjelsås
Møller had his breakthrough in Kjelsås in 2009, scoring 20 of the total 38 goals Kjelsås had that season, preventing relegation from the 2009 Norwegian Second Division. The 2010-season started out with injury problems, but he still ended up scoring 16 goals in the league that season. He was then discovered by the Norwegian scout Stig Marius Torbjørnsen, and went to Tromsø on trial.

Tromsø
On 18 October 2010, he signed a three-year contract with the North Norwegian club. Tromsø manager Per Mathias Høgmo described him as a "goalgetter", and that he would be a great addition to his 2011-squad.

On 4 January 2011, he travelled up north to continue his football career. He made his debut against Tromsdalen in a friendly match in January 2011, coming on in the second half and scored two goals. He came on as a substitute against FC Daugava in the Europa League on 30 June for his first official match. Four days later, in an away match against Fredrikstad FK he was again brought on as a substitute for his first league match.

In 2014, he returned to third-tier Kjelsås. His job outside of playing was that of football commentator, commenting Italian football for C More. In July 2015 he was hired by TV 2 to work with the Premier League.

Career statistics

References

1988 births
Living people
Footballers from Oslo
Norwegian footballers
Kjelsås Fotball players
Tromsø IL players
Strømmen IF players
Biggleswade United F.C. players
Eliteserien players
Norwegian association football commentators
TV 2 (Norway) people
Association football forwards